Brett Palin (born June 23, 1984 in Nanaimo, British Columbia) is a Canadian former professional ice hockey defenceman.

Playing career
Palin played junior hockey with the Kelowna Rockets of the Western Hockey League (WHL), winning the league championship in 2003 and 2005, and the Memorial Cup in 2004. He was a prospect in the Calgary Flames system, having signed with the franchise in 2005 as an undrafted free agent. On July 7, 2010, he signed with the Nashville Predators and was assigned to captain AHL affiliate, the Milwaukee Admirals.

After beginning his European career with KLH Chomutov of the Czech Extraliga for two seasons, Palin signed a one-year contract in Germany with Grizzly Adams Wolfsburg of the Deutsche Eishockey Liga on May 8, 2013.

On June 3, 2015, Palin left the HockeyAllsvenskan after one season with Mora IK and signed a one-year contract with Austrian club, EHC Black Wings Linz of the Austrian Hockey League (EBEL). Palin played two seasons with the Black Wings before concluding his career with Hungarian EBEL club, Fehérvár AV19, in the 2017–18 season.

Career statistics

References

External links

1984 births
Abbotsford Heat players
EHC Black Wings Linz players
Canadian ice hockey defencemen
Fehérvár AV19 players
Ice hockey people from British Columbia
Living people
Kelowna Rockets players
Milwaukee Admirals players
Mora IK players
Omaha Ak-Sar-Ben Knights players
Piráti Chomutov players
Quad City Flames players
Sportspeople from Nanaimo
Grizzlys Wolfsburg players
Canadian expatriate ice hockey players in the Czech Republic
Canadian expatriate ice hockey players in Austria
Canadian expatriate ice hockey players in Germany
Canadian expatriate ice hockey players in Sweden
Canadian expatriate ice hockey players in the United States
Canadian expatriate ice hockey players in Hungary